Corruption in the Palace of Justice is a 1964 Australian television film produced by Oscar Whitbread. Based on an Italian stage play by Ugo Betti, it was a drama aired in a 60-minute time-slot and aired on non-commercial broadcaster ABC. Cast included Michael Duffield, Carl Bleazby, Terry Norris. It was produced in Melbourne. It was adapted by Robert Rietti. A copy of the script is at the NAA.

It was set in a nameless country.

Plot
A court of justice in a nameless city and country is being investigated.
A judge has made himself the accomplice of an underworld victim and this judge infect the whole process of justice. Judge Cust steers suspicion on to President Vanan, the ageing chief of the court, who is innocent.

Cast
Terry Norris as Judge Cust
Michael Duffield as Chief Judge Cross
Wynn Roberts as Counsellor Enzi
Carl Beazby as President Vanan
Fay Kelton as Elena
George Whaley
Kendrick Hudson
Sydney Conabere
Bruce Barry
Horst Bergfreid
Bill Bennett
Marion Edward

Production
It was shot at ABC Studios in Ripponlea, Melbourne. It was designed by Gunars Jurgana.

Reception
Sydney Morning Herald called it "the most thought-provoking hour of TV theatre seen for some time", said "the acting was uniformly good" and that "the coldly aseptic geometry of the set emphasised the contrast of impersonal outwardness to the intense inward turmoil".

The Canberra Times said the play "was most valuable as a showcasefor the talents of Terry)
Norris" but felt "the other side of the coin was the thoroughly wasted talent of actors like Wyn Roberts and Michael Duffield."

See also
 Smiling Maniacs (1975)

References

External links

1960s Australian television plays
Australian drama television films
1964 television films
1964 films
Australian Broadcasting Corporation original programming
English-language television shows
Black-and-white Australian television shows
1964 drama films